Willie James Williams (born December 26, 1970) is a former American football cornerback of the National Football League (NFL), and youth football coach. He is also the cousin of WNBA player Tamera Young.

Career 
Williams was drafted out of Western Carolina University by the Pittsburgh Steelers in 1993, spending 6 of his 13 seasons in the league with the team. He was a key member of the 1995 team that played in Super Bowl XXX, and the only member from that team to be on the roster of the 2005 squad, who won Super Bowl XL.  From 1997 to 2003, Williams played for the Seattle Seahawks, before returning to the Steelers for the 2004 and 2005 seasons.  

On March 3, 2006, Willams and veteran QB Tommy Maddox, were released as salary cap cuts. Williams then retired from football. 

On January 26 2017, he was named the head coach for Winston Churchill High School, where he coached until leaving the team in December 2019.

References

1970 births
Living people
American football cornerbacks
Players of American football from Columbia, South Carolina
Sportspeople from Columbia, South Carolina
Western Carolina Catamounts football players
Pittsburgh Steelers players
Seattle Seahawks players
Western Carolina University alumni